Emmalocera callirrhoda is a species of snout moth in the genus Emmalocera. It was described by Alfred Jefferis Turner in 1904 and is found in Queensland, Australia.

References

Moths described in 1904
Emmalocera